A stringent regulatory authority (SRA) is a national drug regulation authority which is considered by the World Health Organization (WHO) to apply stringent standards for quality, safety, and efficacy in its process of regulatory review of drugs and vaccines for marketing authorization.

The official WHO definition is

The concept of an SRA was developed by the WHO Secretariat and The Global Fund to Fight AIDS, Tuberculosis and Malaria to guide decisions regarding procurement of medicines for humanitarian assistance. The idea is that countries with non-SRA drug authorities can use accelerated process to facilitate approval (registration or marketing authorization) of medicines, including vaccines and biologics, which have already been approved by SRAs.

As of 2022, the national regulatory authorities of 36 countries are considered SRAs:

References

Drug control law
National agencies for drug regulation
Regulators of biotechnology products
World Health Organization